Jack S. Hill (July 15, 1944 – April 6, 2020) was an American politician. A member of the Republican Party, he represented Georgia's 4th District in the Georgia State Senate. At the time of his death, he was the longest-serving Georgia State Senator.

Personal 

Jack Hill was born in Reidsville, Georgia. He was a retired grocer and his wife, Ruth Ann, was an elementary school principal. Together, they had three children and seven grandchildren.

Hill was a graduate of Reidsville High School and Georgia Southern University.

He served in the Georgia Air National Guard for 33 years, both as a unit commander and State Inspector General. Hill died on April 6, 2020. His wife, Ruth Ann Nail Hill, died less than three weeks later on April 24, 2020.

Political career 

Re-elected in 2018 to his 15th two-year term, Senator Hill was first elected to the Georgia State Senate in 1990.

Senator Hill was the Chairman of the Senate Appropriations Committee, and under his leadership Georgia maintained the highest bond rating awarded, a "Triple A," from the national rating agencies.

Senator Hill also served as the Vice Chairman of the Senate Rules Committee. He also served on the Natural Resources and the Environment and Regulated Industries and Utilities, and was an ex-officio member of the Finance Committee. Past chairmanships include: K-12 Education, Ethics, and Higher Education.

Senator Hill represented Georgia's 4th Senatorial District which includes: Bulloch, Candler, Effingham, Emanuel (pt.), Evans and Tattnall (pt.) counties.

Legacy 
Gordonia-Alatamaha State Park was renamed Jack Hill State Park following his death. In February 2021, Georgia Southern University announced plans to build a new convocation center to replace Hanner Fieldhouse; the new arena is planned to be named after both Jack and Ruth Ann Hill and is projected to open in the fall of 2023.

References

Georgia (U.S. state) Democrats
Georgia (U.S. state) Republicans
Georgia (U.S. state) state senators
1944 births
2020 deaths
People from Reidsville, Georgia
Georgia National Guard personnel
Georgia Southern University alumni
Businesspeople from Georgia (U.S. state)
21st-century American politicians